Blackburne is a surname. Notable people with the surname include:

Anna Blackburne (1726–1793), English botanist
Francis Blackburne (1782–1867), Lord Chancellor of Ireland
 Harry Blackburne DSO, MC (1878–1963), an Anglican clergyman
John Ireland Blackburne (1783–1874), MP for Newton (1807–1818) and Warrington (1835–1847)
John Ireland Blackburne (1817–1893), MP for South West Lancashire 1875–1885
Joseph Henry Blackburne (1841–1921), British chess master
Lancelot Blackburne (1658–1743), English clergyman, Archbishop of York, purported pirate
Lena Blackburne (1886–1968), American Major League baseball player and manager

English toponymic surnames